USS Thach (FFG-43), an , was the only ship of the United States Navy named for Admiral John Thach, a Naval Aviator during World War II, who invented the Thach Weave dogfighting tactic.

Construction and design
Thach was laid down on 6 March 1981 by the Todd Pacific Shipyards, Los Angeles Division, San Pedro, California; launched on 18 December 1982; sponsored by Mrs. Madalyn J. Thach, widow of the namesake; and commissioned on 17 March 1984 at Long Beach, Cmdr. Dale H. Moses in command.

Thachs mission was to provide anti-air, anti-surface, and anti-submarine protection for carrier battle groups, naval expeditionary forces, replenishment groups, convoys, and other military and merchant shipping. The new direction for the naval service remained focused on the ability to project power from the sea in the critical littoral regions for the world.

Success in the warfare environment of the 1990s and beyond required thorough evaluation, rapid decision-making and almost instantaneous response to any postulated threat. The systems aboard Thach were designed to meet these demanding and dynamic prerequisites, and to do so with minimum human interface. The Sikorsky SH-60 Seahawk's video data link system brought state-of-the-art computer technology to the warfare arena, as well as integrating sensors and weapons to provide a total offensive and defensive weapons system.

In addition, computers controlled and monitored the gas turbine engines (the same engines installed on DC-10 aircraft) and electrical generators. Digital electronic logic circuits and remotely operated valves were monitored in Central Control Station which initiated engine start and resulted in a "ready to go" status in less than ten minutes.

Service history

Thach was the command ship of Operation Nimble Archer, the 19 October 1987 attack on two Iranian oil platforms in the Persian Gulf by United States Navy forces. The action occurred during Operation Earnest Will, the effort to protect Kuwaiti shipping amid the Iran–Iraq War.

In late 2006 while deployed to the Southern Pacific, Thach caught fire as she attempted to put out a fire on a drug smuggling ship.

Fate 
Thach was decommissioned at Naval Base San Diego on 1 November 2013, Cmdr. Hans E. Lynch in command. The ship was homeported in San Diego and was part of Destroyer Squadron 23. She was sunk on July 14, 2016, during the major naval exercise RIMPAC 2016.

Crest 
Like all heraldic Navy insignias, Thachs crest has special meaning. The blue and gold colors are traditionally associated with the Navy; blue for the sea and gold for excellence. The pair of wings in the upper crest refers to Admiral Thach's contributions to naval aviation as a pilot and leader. One of the contributions to naval aviation as a pilot and leader was his invention of the "Thach Weave," symbolized by the interlaced silver chevrons. This two-plane fighter tactic, used to cover each other from enemy fighters, is still used by fighter aircraft today.

The three-pronged trident is shown pointing down from the sky, symbolizing naval aviation's role of projecting power from the sky and the sea. The three tines of the trident also represent Fight Squadron Three, the unit Admiral Thach commanded during early Pacific carrier battles in World War II. The cross within its outlined border and the wreath refer to Admiral Thach's first and second awards of the Navy Cross and the Navy Distinguished Service Medal.

The anchor in the center of the insignia focused attention on the nautical nature of both Admiral Thach's service to his country. The ship's motto, "Ready and Able", was representative of Admiral Thach's preparation and success.

Gallery

References

External links 

 navysite.de: USS Thach
MaritimeQuest USS Thach FFG-43 pages
Navy.mil March 2006 article on Bahamas goodwill mission
 USS Thach (FFG-43) command histories – Naval History & Heritage Command:
1984 • 1985 • 1987 • 1988 • 1989 • 1990 • 1991 • 1992 • 1993 • 1994 • 1995 • 1996 • 1999 • 2000 • 2001 • 2002

 

Ships built in Los Angeles
1982 ships
Oliver Hazard Perry-class frigates of the United States Navy
Maritime incidents in 2016
Ships sunk as targets
Shipwrecks in the Pacific Ocean